Stephen of Montfaucon (1325 – 1 November 1397) was Lord of Montfaucon and Count of Montbéliard from 1367 until his death.  He was the son of Henry of Montfaucon and Agnes of Chalon.  He married Marguerite of Chalon-Arlay, daughter of John II of Chalon-Arlay, and they had three children:

 Louis; died young
 Henry of Orbe (died 1396)
 Johanna; married Louis of Neuchâtel

House of Montfaucon
Counts of Montbéliard
1325 births
1397 deaths